The Sterkfontein Dam, located just outside the town of Harrismith, in the Free State, province of South Africa, is part of the Tugela-Vaal Water Project and the Drakensberg Pumped Storage Scheme, and located on the Nuwejaarspruit, a tributary of the Wilge River in the upper catchment area of the Vaal River. It is the second highest dam wall in South Africa and its highest earth fill dam.

Background

History
The rapid economic expansion of the greater Johannesburg area in the 1960s and 70s put its water supply under long term threat and it was decided to redirect water from the large Tugela River which was going largely un-used into the sea and store it in large strategic water storage reservoir with very low evaporation.  The initial site chosen for this project was in the adjacent valley to the west on the Elands River.  This was the preferred option from an engineering aspect because it would involve a smaller dam wall.  However shortly before construction was about to start the site on the Nuwejaarspruit was selected for political reasons because it avoided the partial flooding of the newly planned Bantustan of Qwaqwa in Phuthadichaba. It could have meant this strategic national resource could have been located in a "foreign country" which would have been unacceptable as seen from the perspective of the current government in that time.

Construction
At full supply, it has a surface area of no more than 70 km2. The total construction period was 11 years. The Sterkfontein Dam was designed and constructed by the Department of Water Affairs. 
The dam mainly serves for domestic and industrial use and its hazard potential has been ranked high (3).

Naming
The dam was named after one of the farms located in the vicinity of its construction.  The temporary township for the construction workers was built on the Sterkfontein farm.  The word sterkfontein means strong spring in Afrikaans.

Characteristics

Earth Fill Dam Wall
The wall is an earth gravity type. The dam wall contains  of material making it the largest dam wall in South Africa with regard to volume. The reservoir is impounded by two walls.

No spillway
The dam is unique as the majority of water is sourced by diverting flow from the upper reaches of the Tugela river. This water would otherwise be underutilised and flow into the ocean. The dam was not built on a river but instead, it is sited on what can at best be classed as a large stream in the upper reaches of a valley on the Nuwejaarspruit. The catchment area of the dam is less than three times the water surface area of the dam and therefore not risk to a flood. For this reason the main dam wall does not have the need for a spillway.  Any excess rainwater can be safely ejected from its outlet valves.  The advantage of this location is the Dam is a highly effective reservoir, since it has the depth to store a large amount of water, with very little loss to evaporation. The Vaal Dam lake (reservoir) by comparison has a large surface area and is relatively shallow, which results in a higher rate of evaporation. It would take 17 years of rainfall to fill the dam. But capturing rainfall was not an important intent behind this project. It was built to capture water from the Tugela river and deliver it into the Vaal system.

Pumped Hydro Storage Scheme

This is stored in the Sterkfontein Dam and released to the Vaal Dam via the Wilge River when needed.

A dam within a dam

The Driekloof Dam which is inside the Sterkfontein Dam, is regarded as a separated dam and reservoir, and is not included in the above figures. It is essentially a dam within a dam.  Driekloof Dam is the upper storage reservoir of the Drakensberg Pumped Storage Scheme.  If the Sterkfontein Dam were to be empty the Driekloof reservoir would retain the water for the pumped storage scheme to operate unimpeded.  When Sterkfontein Dam is at full capacity the Driekloof Dam is submerged up to the top of its spillway.

Third largest dam in South Africa
This is the 3rd largest dam in South Africa in terms of water capacity and it is slightly larger than Vaal Dam.
 Gariep Dam 5,340,600 MegaL
 Vanderkloof Dam 3,171,300 MegaL
 Sterkfontein Dam 2,616,900 MegaL
 Vaal Dam 2,603,400 MegaL

Protected areas
The Sterkfontein Dam Nature Reserve is a protected area located by the dam.

Photo gallery

See also 
 List of reservoirs and dams in South Africa

References

External links 

 Department of Water Affairs and Forestry

Dams in South Africa
Vaal River
Dams completed in 1977
Maluti-a-Phofung